Tren al Desarrollo (in English: "Train to Development") is an elevated commuter rail service between the cities of Santiago del Estero (from the "Forum" station) and La Banda (with also a new building) in Santiago del Estero Province. Trains run on  Mitre Railway tracks were disused. The line also crosses the Puente Negro, a bridge that had been closed for over 40 years. 

In the beginning, the project only planned a 4 km-long line, then extended to 8 km. length to reach La Banda.

The Rolling stock used is railbuses made by Argentine company TecnoTren. Each unit has a capacity of 100 passengers (70 seated). The journey time will be about 25 minutes. Santiago Centro terminus station was inaugurated in May 2015.

A total of 3 new stations were projected to be built, "Botánico" (with access to the botanical garden), "Parque Tecnológico" (in the industrial park of the city) and "Banda", the terminus of the line. The total path from Forum to Banda stations will be a 5,10 metre-high viaduct to avoid interfering with road traffic.

A third phase of the project focuses on reaching the Termas de Río Hondo, one of the main attractions of the Province, although it could be extended to San Miguel de Tucumán.

In September 2016, the first section of 4-km length (from Santiago to Nodo Tecnológico) was inaugurated. The next section of La Banda is expected to be opened in March 2017.

References

External links
 

d
Railway services introduced in 2016
t
t